The following provides a partial list of products manufactured under the Sony brand.

Electronics

Televisions & Home Cinema 

 Televisions
 Home theater and Sound bars
 Blu-ray disc & DVD players

Audio 

 Car audio
 Receivers & players
 Amplifiers
 Speakers and subwoofers
 Sony Marine
 Headphones
 MP3 players
 Walkman
 High-resolution audio
 Wireless speakers
 360 reality audio
 Speakers
 Audio systems
 Audio components
 Digital voice recorders
 Boomboxes, radios and portable CD players
 Home cinema

Cameras 

 Interchangeable-lens Cameras
 Lenses
 Compact cameras
 Camcorders
 Action cameras
 Professional video cameras
 Cinema line cameras

Mobile phones

Storage and cables 

 Memory cards
 SSD disks
 Cables

Sony Olympus Medical Solutions 
Sony Olympus Medical Solutions Inc. was founded on April 16, 2013, as a cooperation between Sony (owns 51%) and Olympus (owns 49%) with a goal to develop, design and sell surgical endoscopes with 4K+ resolution and 3D technologies.

Sony professional 
Sony Professional offers professional solutions for cinematography, filmmaking, news production, live production, education, corporate and healthcare needs.

 Professional cameras
 Studio and Broadcast Cameras
 Digital Cinema Cameras
 Camcorders
 PTZ and Remote Cameras
 Broadcast and production
 Professional Monitors
 Decks and Recorders
 Switchers and Live Systems
 Professional Media
 Projectors
 Professional Projectors
 Home Cinema Projectors
 Professional displays
 Displays
 LED Walls
 Software
 Archiving and content management
 Optical Disc Archiving
 Media Asset Management
 IT Storage Media
 Digitisation and Consolidation
 Medical imaging
 Imaging Cameras
 Monitors
 Recorders and Storage
 IP Imaging Platform
 Printers and Print Media
 Audio systems
 Professional Audio
 Microphone Array System
 Professional Speakers
 Smart systems
 Workplace Management

Semiconductors 

Sony semiconductor business began in 1954. Today's division Sony Semiconductor Solutions Group was founded in 2015 and focuses on manufacturing image sensors, microdisplays, LSI, laser diodes.

Image sensors 
Sony produces image sensors for automotive, industry, security, consumer cameras and mobile phones.

Image sensors for automotive industry

Image sensors for industry

 Area image sensor - industrial applications (Global Shutter and Rolling Shutter models)
 Polarization image sensor - capture polarization image with on-chip polarizer
 UV image sensor - capture images in Ultraviolet spectrum
 SWIR image sensor - capture images in Short-Wave infrared light spectrum
 ToF image sensor - creates 3D images by measuring the distance to the object
 Event-based vision sensor - event-based technology acquires high-speed data by only detecting luminance changes

Image sensors for security cameras

Image sensors for consumer cameras

Image sensors mobile devices

Large-scale integration (LSI) 

 GPS/GNSS Receiver
 Cellular IoT Modem (External Link)
 Gigabit Video Interface
 Audio Codec IC

SPRESENSE 
A low-power board computer for the IoT.

Telecommunications equipment

Sony Network Communications 
Sony Network Communications Inc. was founded in November 1995.

Entertainment

TV shows, Films

Music

Video games

Other 

 Sony Computer Science Laboratories, Inc.
 Sony AI Inc.
 Sony VISION-S
 Sony Airpeak
 Sony Financial Group
 Small Optical Link for International Space Station (SOLISS)

References

External links 
 Sony businesses & products

Sony